Sua Pan Airport or Sowa Airport  is an airport  west of Sowa, a town in the Central District of Botswana.

The runway is between the north and south basins of the Sua Pan (also known as Sowa Pan), a salt pan where sodium carbonate (soda ash) is mined. Sowa means salt in the language of the San.

See also

Transport in Botswana
List of airports in Botswana

References

External links
OpenStreetMap - Sua Pan
OurAirports - Sua Pan
SkyVector - Sua Pan
Botswana CAAB - Sua Pan Airport

Airports in Botswana
Central District (Botswana)